The black money scam, sometimes also known as the "black dollar scam" or "wash wash scam", is a scam where con artists attempt to fraudulently obtain money from a victim by convincing them that piles of banknote-sized paper are real currency that has been stained in a heist. The victim is persuaded to pay fees and purchase chemicals to remove the dye, with the promise of a share in the proceeds.

The black money scam is a variation of what is known as advance fee fraud.

Phases

Initial contact
Typically the scammer will send out thousands, if not millions, of e-mails to known and random e-mail addresses, hoping for a few replies.  The initial message may read something like this:
I am a lawyer in Belgium and I am charged with seeking the rightful heir to certain assets which were deposited many years ago with a security company here in Brussels by a man who died a few years ago.  We have made extensive searches to find any living heirs, but with minimal success.  A man with your name is named in the Will and Testament as being the only beneficiary of these assets.  We believe that you may be the person entitled and are writing to enquire if you have any dead relatives or friends who may have named you as a beneficiary of these assets in their will and testament.  If so please let us have their names and any other information so we can check if you are indeed the beneficiary.  The amount of the assets is $150,000 and one large trunk, contents unknown.  Please reply immediately

Sometimes however, the scammer resorts to directly approaching the victim.

Advance fees
As the communications between the two parties continue, it will become necessary for certain fees and expenses to be paid, including government taxes, or death duties.  In reality, there are no such taxes to be paid.  However, the need to pay fees or taxes is used as a means of extracting more money from the victim and keeping up their interest in seeing the venture through to its end.

False valuation of trunk contents
Eventually by various means and devices the victim will be persuaded that the trunk contains a large sum of cash, which cannot be transferred in any other form (bonds, cheques, etc.) for some reason. In addition, the bills have been dyed black or some other color, or defaced with prominent ink stamps, in order to avoid detection or seizure by customs officials. The victim is assured that the chemical needed for removing the dye/ink is also in the trunk.

The victim may have already provided some money to pay fees and taxes, and they may now be invited to pay the shipping expenses of the trunk to their home country.  Whether these are paid or not, the trunk will not be shipped and further sums will be demanded on various pretexts, such as taxes, security company fees, money transfer fees, legalization fees, export permissions, etc.

Victim goes to see the "money"
When at some point the victim is having doubts, or showing reluctance to pay any more, they will be invited to inspect the contents of the safety deposit trunk in person.  The box will be opened and the contentsbanknote-sized pieces of ordinary black paperare shown to the victim. The scammer will claim that a chemical exists which can remove the dye from the money.

Washing a small sample of the black "money"
Then the conman will produce a small vial of the washing liquid and ask the victim to select any stained bank note at random. This done, the conman proceeds to wash the banknote in the chemical, performing a sleight of hand in which he substitutes either an already-clean note or one stained with dye that can be removed by the chemical. There will be insufficient liquid to wash any more money, or the conman may "accidentally" spill the remaining contents.

More funds needed to pay for washing chemical fluid
The victim cannot take away the trunk, or any notes, since they are informed that the taxes have not been paid, but once the notes are "washed", it will be easy to pay the taxes and there will be money left over.  The victim is persuaded that they must buy a rare and expensive chemical that can clean the notes.  Once again the victim parts with money to the fraudster.  Sometimes the fraudsters will set up a website purporting to be a seller of the cleaning fluid, which has such a unique and unusual name that it cannot be found anywhere else. This adds to the credibility of the story and the victim may even contact the website directly to buy the fluid, allowing the conmen yet another chance to con the victim. Alternatively the conmen may also refer the victim to a specific online advertisement for the chemical and black money.

Further delays and fees
The fraudsters will continue to find excuses as to why the victim cannot have their money just yet, but will always promise it after one "last and absolutely final step", which involves the payment of yet another fee by the victim.  The scammers will continue to make the victim pay until they are sure they have no more money, and that they cannot get any by begging and borrowing from friends or banks, or until the victim realizes that they are being scammed, and gets the police involved.  The fraudsters themselves, and the victim's money, are usually long gone by the time the police are involved.

Reporting of the crime
Most such frauds are not reported by the victims for several reasons.  First, they may feel terribly ashamed that they could be so naïve.  Second, many of the scams will involve the victim knowingly agreeing to receive the proceeds of a crimee.g. they may be informed that it is drug money, tax evasion money, or simply stolen.  Sometimes the scammer will have persuaded the victim to incriminate themself, e.g. by falsifying a document, or lying on a tax declaration, et cetera. The victim may thus be reluctant to come forward and admit that they were knowingly participating in what they thought was a criminal scheme.

Terminology used in the scam
 The defaced money
 Anti-breeze bank notes
 Black Money
 The chemical
 S.S.D. Solution
 Vectrol Paste
 Tebi-Manetic
 Humine Powder
 solid solution
 Shiba / Fay
 Motion
 Decharge
 Sahualla

Chemicals used
A Ghanaian native caught perpetrating the scam revealed the tricks of the trade to ABC News Chief Investigative Correspondent Brian Ross. Authentic US$100 bills are coated with a protective layer of glue, and then dipped into a solution of tincture of iodine. The bill, when dried, looks and feels like black sugar paper. The mass of notes are real sugar paper; when the victim picks a "note" for cleaning, it is switched with the iodine coated note. The "magic cleaning solution" is actually crushed vitamin C tablets dissolved in water. In another arrest, ordinary raspberry drink mix was found to be the "magic cleaning solution". Solutions of calcium hydroxide and magnesium hydroxide have also been used as washing agents in the scam.

References

External links 

 Metropolitan Police Information on the fraud from the London Metropolitan Police Service
 BBC An article from the BBC on how a businessman was conned out of $742,000.
 Two conmen in dollar bill hoax arrested Gulf News article from December 2018.
 Fraudaid How to do it.
 IOL Cops arrest 'black dollar' victim October 2007

Confidence tricks
Spamming
Social engineering (computer security)